Sir Robert Bennet  was an English surveyor and politician who sat in the House of Commons from 1621 to 1622.

Bennet was the grandson of Robert Bennet, Bishop of Hereford. He was surveyor of the works Windsor Castle. He was knighted at Greenwich on 11 June 1619. In 1621, Bennet was elected Member of Parliament for Windsor.

References

Year of birth missing
Year of death missing
English MPs 1621–1622